The National Academy of Chinese Theatre Arts (NACTA) is a Chinese public university in Fengtai District, Beijing which offers B.A., M.A. and M.F.A. degrees in Chinese opera. Niu Junfeng is a notable alumni from National Academy of Chinese Theatre Arts. Xu Weizhou is also a notable alumni. Currently there are 2,500 students and 250 faculty members.

History
It was founded in 1950 as China Drama School, and Tian Han was its first principal. Wang Yaoqing became its principal in 1951. By 1954, when Yan Yong became the principal, it was under the leadership of China's Ministry of Culture. It became the National Academy of Chinese Theatre Arts in 1978.

Departments
Department of Peking Opera for Peking opera
Department of Performing Arts for other Chinese opera genres such as Kunqu
Department of Directing
Department of Music
Department of Dramatic Writing
Department of Stage Design
Department of International Exchange

Transport
Lize Shangwuqu station (Exit D)

References

External links

Universities and colleges in Beijing
1950 establishments in China
Music schools in China
Drama schools in China
Schools of Chinese opera
Art schools in China
Educational institutions established in 1950